Peter Sekulic (born 1962) is a Canadian former politician in the province of Alberta.

Sekulic was born in Croatia in 1962 and immigrated with his parents and a sibling to Canada in 1967. He was elected to the Legislative Assembly of Alberta in the 1993 Alberta general election. Peter defeated former Edmonton Belmont incumbent New Democrat Tom Sigurdson to pick up the new district of Edmonton Manning for the Alberta Liberal Party.

Sekulic served a single term in the legislature, he was the Deputy Native Affairs Critic for the Liberal opposition.

Sekulic currently works for Strategic Relations Inc. with former MLA Jon Havelock.

References

External links
Strategic Relations Inc.

Living people
Alberta Liberal Party MLAs
Canadian people of Croatian descent
1962 births